Katherine Chloe Sinsuat de Castro-Cruz, (born October 18, 1978) also known as Kat de Castro, is a Filipino journalist, and former television personality, who was formerly the Undersecretary of Tourism Advocacy and Public Affairs of the Philippine Department of Tourism (DOT) under Secretary Wanda Corazon Teo. She took her oath of office at the Malacañang Palace on August 15, 2016. She later resigned from her post in 2018 after being asked by Secretary Bernadette Romulo-Puyat to do so. After a year, she was re-appointed as President & CEO of Intercontinental Broadcasting Corporation (IBC). She previously served as the General Manager and Board Director of People's Television Network (PTV) from 2020 until 2022.

Biography
De Castro is one of the three children of former Vice President and ABS-CBN News anchor Noli de Castro and former ABS-CBN Current Affairs executive Arlene de Castro, who now heads Bayan Productions. She was among the personalities who actively support the former Davao City Mayor and Philippine President Rodrigo Duterte's campaign during the 2016 Philippine presidential election. In fact, she is a co-organizer of the DU31: One Love, One Nation Thanksgiving Party held last June 4, 2016, at the Davao Crocodile Park.

She was the former host of the travel show Trip na Trip and business magazine show Swak na Swak, both produced by Bayan Productions, their own production house, and aired on ABS-CBN. She was also a host for her father's own public affairs program Magandang Gabi, Bayan and a reporter for ABS-CBN News.

De Castro finished Communication Arts degree at Miriam College.

Controversies

De Castro was involved in several controversies in relation to her short stint as Tourism undersecretary. She received overwhelming backlash from netizens who believed there was conflict of interest for allowing her boyfriend, musician Pancho Juanitez, to perform in DOT-sponsored events. Juanitez was also spotted chauffeuring de Castro in official gatherings of the agency.

In May 2018, Commission on Audit (COA) found that there is a memorandum of agreement on file between the DOT and the government-owned People's Television Network (PTV) requiring the latter to air a 6-minute tourism advertisement section in PTV's Kilos Pronto, a public service program. This has been criticized, since at the time of the agreement the Department of Tourism Secretary was Wanda Tulfo Teo, the sister of the producers and hosts of the show (Erwin and Ben Tulfo). De Castro was summoned at the Senate for questioning being the chair of DOT's Bids and Awards Committee, which oversees the bidding process of the contractors for the projects and activities of the department.

De Castro approved an invitation to bid for the procurement of jackets to be given to birthday celebrants in the DOT worth . The said practice of providing jackets was halted by the succeeding DOT Secretary, Bernadette Romulo-Puyat. In August 2018, Romulo-Puyat requested de Castro to vacate her position in relation to the irregularities that occurred in her office. She was then appointed to become a member of the board of directors of Intercontinental Broadcasting Corporation (IBC) on August 22.

References

.

Living people
1978 births
Filipino journalists
Intercontinental Broadcasting Corporation people
ABS-CBN News and Current Affairs people
Duterte administration personnel
Miriam College alumni